A Dangerous Summer (aka Flash Fire) is a 1982 Australian crime film drama film directed by Quentin Masters and starring Tom Skerritt, Ian Gilmour, Guy Doleman and James Mason.

Production
The film was inspired by the Sydney bush fires of the 1979-80 summer. John Seale shot footage of the fire which Brian Trenchard-Smith turned into a 25-minute film, That Dangerous Summer. It was then announced this material would be used by Trenchard Smith in a feature version of the story, to be called Bushfire. In the end, Trenchard-Smith did not direct, and Quentin Masters did. Actor Ian Gilmour broke his leg during filming.

Box office
 A Dangerous Summer  grossed $33,000 at the box office in Australia.

See also
Cinema of Australia

References

External links

A Dangerous Summer at Oz Movies

1982 films
1982 crime drama films
Films about arson
Films about firefighting
Australian crime drama films
1980s English-language films
Films directed by Quentin Masters
1980s Australian films